Frederick W. Bruggerhof (October 15, 1830 – March 8, 1920) was a member of the Connecticut House of Representatives from Darien in 1874, and a member of the Connecticut Senate representing the 12th District from 1875 to 1877.

He was born on October 15, 1830, in Prussia. He spent his early years in the United States in St Louis.

He was the President of James M. Thorburn & Company in New York City, a seed company. He was known as the "grand old man of the seed world."

He was a member of the Electoral College in 1884 and cast his vote for Grover Cleveland.

References

1830 births
1920 deaths
American horticulture businesspeople
Democratic Party Connecticut state senators
Democratic Party members of the Connecticut House of Representatives
People from Darien, Connecticut
1884 United States presidential electors
German emigrants to the United States